The Municipality of Ribnica is a municipality in southern Slovenia. The seat of the municipality is the town of Ribnica. It is part of the traditional region of Lower Carniola and is now included in the Southeast Slovenia Statistical Region.

Archaeological evidence shows that the area has been settled at least since the late Bronze Age between 1300 and 900 BC.

Settlements
In addition to the municipal seat of Ribnica, the municipality also includes the following settlements:

 Andol
 Blate
 Breg pri Ribnici na Dolenjskem
 Breže
 Brinovščica
 Bukovec pri Poljanah
 Bukovica
 Črnec
 Črni Potok pri Velikih Laščah
 Dane
 Dolenja Vas
 Dolenje Podpoljane
 Dolenji Lazi
 Dule
 Finkovo
 Gašpinovo
 Gorenje Podpoljane
 Gorenji Lazi
 Goriča Vas
 Graben
 Grčarice
 Grčarske Ravne
 Grebenje
 Grič
 Hojče
 Hrovača
 Hudi Konec
 Jelendol
 Jelenov Žleb
 Junčje
 Jurjevica
 Kot pri Rakitnici
 Kot pri Ribnici
 Krnče
 Levstiki
 Lipovec
 Makoše
 Marolče
 Maršiči
 Nemška Vas
 Ortnek
 Otavice
 Perovo
 Praproče
 Prigorica
 Pugled pri Karlovici
 Pusti Hrib
 Rakitnica
 Rigelj pri Ortneku
 Sajevec
 Škrajnek
 Slatnik
 Sušje
 Sveti Gregor
 Velike Poljane
 Vintarji
 Vrh pri Poljanah
 Zadniki
 Zadolje
 Zapuže pri Ribnici
 Zlati Rep
 Žlebič
 Žukovo

Notable people
Notable people that were born or lived in the Municipality of Ribnica include:
Bojan Adamič (1912–1995), composer (born in Ribnica)
Jacobus Gallus (1550–1591), composer (presumed born in Ribnica)
Janez Evangelist Krek (1865–1917), Christian social activist and politician (born in Sveti Gregor)
France Prešeren (1800–1849), poet (studied in Ribnica)
Simona Škrabec (born 1968), translator, essayist, and literary historian (spent her childhood in Ribnica)
Ivan Šušteršič (1863–1925), conservative politician (born in Ribnica)

References

External links
 
 Municipality of Ribnica website

 
1994 establishments in Slovenia
Ribnica